Aq Kahriz (also Romanized as Āq Kahrīz; also known as Tāzeh Kand) is a village in Sis Rural District, in the Central District of Shabestar County, East Azerbaijan Province, Iran. At the 2006 census, its population was 261, in 68 families.

References 

Populated places in Shabestar County